Chen Zhenglei (born 15 May 1949) is a Chinese taijiquan Grandmaster, who was born and raised in Chenjiagou  (Chen Village, 陳家溝), Wen County, Henan Province, China, and is a 19th generation of the Chen family and 11th generation direct-line successor of Chen Family Taijiquan Chen-style taijiquan. His teachers were Chen Zhaopi and Chen Zhaokui.

Background
Chen Zhenglei was born in Chenjiagou  (Chen Village, 陳家溝), Wen County, Henan Province, China. In 1957, Chen Zhenglei started the studying Taijiquan with his uncle Chen Zhaopi, focusing not just in hands form and weapons but also Taiji theories very intently. In 1972, after Chen Zhaopi death, Chen Zhenglei continued the  studies from his uncles, Chen Zhaokui, another famous Taijiquan teacher who was the son of Chen Fake.

Chen Zhenglei specializes in the theories and skills of Taijiquan and push-hands, directly by his grandfather’s brother Chen Fake.

He is recognized as one of four "Buddha's Warrior Attendants (Si Jingang)," the four outstanding exponents of the 19th generation in Chenjiagou. Those four Chen stylists including Chen Xiaowang (陳小旺; Chen Fake's direct grandson), Chen Zhenglei (陈正雷; 1949–), Wang Xian and Zhu Tiancai traveled relentlessly giving global workshops and creating an international group of Chen-style practitioners.

He is listed in the China Contemporary Education Celebrities Dictionary, China Present Martial Arts Masters, and Contemporary reform elites.

He is the creator of the 18 Short Form of Lao Jia.

In December 1995, Chen Zhenglei was recognized as one of Top Ten Martial Arts Masters of Present Day living in China.

Since 1998, the Chinese Wushu Association together with the National Sport Commission and the Chinese Wushu Research Institute has established a graduation system based on nine Duan levels (Dan (rank)), Chen Zhenglei achieved the 9th Duan Wei Grandmaster (Jinlong—jiu duan: Gold Dragon) level in 2012, and he is one of the few holders of the highest rank of the Duan wei system.

Author
He wrote and produced dozens of books and DVDs about Taijiquan, they were translated into Japanese, English, Spanish and Korean etc. and have been released in many countries.

References

External links
 Chen Zhenglei personal page
 Chen Style Taijiquan Portal

1949 births
Living people
Chinese tai chi practitioners
Sportspeople from Henan